A list of trance music subgenres and derivations. Several crossover with other major forms of electronic music.

Subgenres

Derivations

References

 
T